Richard Joseph King (Rísteard Ó Cíonga) (7 July 1907–17 March 1974) was an Irish stained glass artist and illustrator. He was born in Castlebar, County Mayo, Ireland, where his father was a sergeant in the Royal Irish Constabulary. In 1926 he became a student at the Dublin Metropolitan School of Art and he entered the stained glass studio of Harry Clarke in 1928. Clarke died in early 1931, of tuberculosis while trying to recuperate in Switzerland. King completed the ongoing work on the windows of St. Mel's Cathedral in Longford, and managed the studio from 1935 to 1940. He then worked independently from his own studio in Dalkey. Among his works are the stained glass windows of St. Jude's Shrine, Faversham, St. Anthony's church Athlone, five full size windows in St. Peter and Paul's church in Athlone including one of St. Patrick depicted without a beard with an inscription in Irish underneath referencing a prophecy of St. Columcille that the fire of Christianity would never go out in Ireland, and three windows in the James Jeffrey Roche Room in Boston College’s Bapst Library.

Many of his illustrations are to be found in the Capuchin Annual from 1940 onwards.

Between 1933 and 1949 he designed twelve Irish postage stamps. They are: Holy Year, 1933; Constitution, 1937; St. Patrick, 1937; Davitt and Parnell, 1946; four airmail stamps, 1948/1949; G.A.A., 1934; Four Masters, 1944; Thomas Davis, 1945; James Clarence Mangan, 1949.

He died at his home in Raheny on St Patrick's Day, 1974.

References

External links 
 Stained glass

1907 births
People from County Mayo
People from Raheny
Irish illustrators
Irish stained glass artists and manufacturers
Irish stamp designers
1974 deaths